Karl Denke  (11 February 1860 – 22 December 1924) was a German serial killer and cannibal who killed and cannibalized dozens of homeless vagrants and travelers from 1903 to 1924. He is often regarded as The Forgotten Cannibal or The Cannibal of Münsterberg.

Early life 
Denke was born on 11 February 1860 in Oberkunzendorf, north-east of Münsterberg, Silesia, in the Kingdom of Prussia (now Ziębice, Poland), to a family of German farmers. Little is known of Denke's childhood, but it is known that he was often described as a quiet and soft-spoken child who was difficult to raise. At the age of 12, Denke ran away from home.

Later years 
After graduating from elementary school, Denke became the apprentice of a gardener, and made a life for himself. At the age of 25,  Denke's father died and his older brother inherited their childhood home, while Denke received a portion of money, which he used to buy a piece of land. Denke tried farming, but this failed and Denke sold it as a result. Denke purchased a house on what is now Stawowa Street, but inflation forced him to sell it. Denke still refused to move out and lived in a small apartment to the right of the house's ground floor. He also ran a nearby shop where he sold meat (which most speculate to have contained human remains). Denke volunteered as a cross-bearer and organist at the local Lutheran church, and was well-liked in his community, often affectionately referred to as "Papa" by the community. Denke quit his membership in the church in 1906.

Murders 
Karl Denke, for unknown reasons, began murdering homeless vagrants and poor travelers. His first known victim was Ida Launer in 1903. Six years later, in 1909, he killed 25-year-old Emma Sander (another slaughterhouse worker, Eduard Trautmann, was found guilty of her murder, but was released in 1926 after the truth was discovered). His last known victim was Rochus Pawlick. Denke also kept a ledger recording his murders. He is also believed to have sold the flesh of his victims as pickled meat to unsuspecting customers (advertised as pork).

Arrest, suicide, and aftermath 
On 21 December 1924, Denke lured a homeless drifter named Vincenz Olivier into his home with the promise of twenty pfennig if he wrote a letter for him. Olivier had been directed to Denke by a townswoman, as Denke was known for his charitable nature. According to Olivier, he had sat down at a desk after being handed a pen and paper, but turned to his host after becoming perplexed when Denke dictated "Adolph, du fetter Wanst!" ("Adolph, you fat slob!"), just in time to see him in the process of raising a pickaxe to strike Olivier's head. The victim managed to duck, receiving an deep gash (8 cm in length and 2 cm wide) to the temple before he was able to wrestle the weapon from Denke in the ensuing struggle. Olivier escaped through the front door, screaming that a "madman" was trying to kill him, attracting the attention of neighbors, who then alerted the authorities. Initially, Olivier's testimony was disregarded on account of Denke's reputation among townsfolk, leading to his arrest for vagrancy and panhandling. The judge, however, insisted on further investigation of Olivier's claims, whereupon Denke was taken in for questioning. He was placed in a holding cell, where he hanged himself just hours later with an unspecified ligature (the exact nature of which varies from account to account) before an interrogation could take place. In light of this, Denke's home was searched and police found the gruesome truth of his murders and cannibalism. While the exact number of his victims is unknown, Denke's ledger had 31 names recorded (including Olivier, the escaped victim), confirming at least 30 victims. But due to the large number of body parts found in his home, Denke's body count was estimated to be as high as 42 or even higher.

A detailed report of what was found includes:

 sixteen femurs, with one pair of remarkably strong ones, two pairs of very thin ones, six pairs and two left femurs
 fifteen medium-sized pieces of long bones
 four pairs of elbow bones
 seven heads of radii
 nine lower parts of radii
 eight lower parts of the elbow
 a pair of upper shinbone
 a pair of lower elbows and radii, of which extremities still remain well connected
 a pair of upper arms and a pair of upper arm heads
 a pair of collar bones
 two shoulder blades
 eight heels and ankle bones
 120 toes and phalanx
 65 feet and metacarpal bones
 five first ribs and 150 pieces of ribs

Decades later, Denke's case remains mostly forgotten. Still much about Denke's life, motives, methods, and the exact number of victims remains unknown. Even the only known photograph of him (the one above) was taken after his death. 

Spree killer Wilhelm Brückner was found to have had an interest in Denke and Fritz Haarmann's cases, with a note in his workplace reading "Massenmörder Haarmann! Massenmörder Denke! Massenmörder ? ? ?" (Mass murderer Haarmann! Mass murderer Denke! Mass murderer ? ? ?).

Media 
 Fritz Lang said in an interview that Denke was among several inspirations for his 1931 thriller film M.
 The film Motel Hell has a resemblance to Denke's case, featuring a farmer who entraps and kills tourists to harvest their flesh for his smoked meats.
 Author Lydia Benecke published a psychological profile of Denke in 2013.
 Casefile covered Denke's case in its 212th episode titled "The Forgotten Cannibal" on May 21, 2022.

See also 
 List of German serial killers
 List of serial killers by number of victims

References

Sources 
 Sieveking, P. (ed.) (1979) Man bites Man: The Scrapbook of an Edwardian Eccentric, Jay Landesman Limited: London. .

Further reading

External links 
 , other short article: 

1860 births
1924 deaths
1924 suicides
Axe murder
German cannibals
German people who died in prison custody
German serial killers
Male serial killers
People from the Province of Silesia
People from Ziębice
Prisoners who died in German detention
Serial killers who committed suicide in prison custody
Suicides by hanging in Germany